Kompolje is a small settlement on the main road from Ljubljana to Celje in the Municipality of Lukovica in the eastern part of the Upper Carniola region of Slovenia.

References

External links 

Kompolje on Geopedia

Populated places in the Municipality of Lukovica